Dr. William C. Verdery House is a historic home located at Fayetteville, Cumberland County, North Carolina. It was built in 1936, and is a Colonial Revival style brick dwelling.  It consists of a two-story, main block flanked by a two-story wing and a one-story porch wing on the west and a one-story wing and recessed two-bay wing on the east.  It is topped by a slate gable roof and features an Ionic order entrance surround.

It was listed on the National Register of Historic Places in 2007.

References

Houses on the National Register of Historic Places in North Carolina
Colonial Revival architecture in North Carolina
Houses completed in 1936
Houses in Fayetteville, North Carolina
National Register of Historic Places in Cumberland County, North Carolina